Legal age or codified age refers to age at which a person may legally engage in a certain activity. Most frequently, this is the age of majority (also known as the "age of maturity"), the threshold of adulthood as recognized in law.

Other ages of legal significance include:

 Age of candidacy, the age at which a person can legally qualify to hold certain elected government offices
 Age of consent, the legal age for sexual activities, the age at which a person is considered to be legally competent to consent to sexual acts
 Age of criminal responsibility
 Driving age, the age at which a person is permitted by law to drive
 Gambling age, the age at which a person is permitted by law to gamble 
 Legal drinking age, the age at which a person is permitted by law to consume alcoholic beverages
 Legal working age, the age at which a person is allowed to work
 Marriageable age, the age at which a person is allowed to marry
 Retirement age
 School leaving age
 Smoking age, the minimum legal age to purchase cigarettes
 Voting age, the minimum legal age to be eligible to vote in a public election

Handling of February 29 
If a legal age is to be attained by a person whose birthday is on February 29, the person may be deemed to reach the age by February 28 or March 1 on non-leap years depending on jurisdiction.

Australia 

In Australia, the court has judged that a person whose birthday is on February 29 legally turns an adult on March 1, but not February 28.

Hong Kong 

Section 5, Cap. 410 Age of Majority Ordinance specifies that where a person has been born on 29 February in a leap year, the relevant anniversary in any year other than a leap year shall be taken to be 1 March.

Taiwan 

Article 121 in the Civil Code specifies that, "if there is no corresponding day in the last month, the period ends with the ending of the last day of the last month.", and article 124 specifies that "The age of a person is counted from his birthday." Therefore, if the birthday is on February 29, it falls on February 28 if the date February 29 doesn't exist in a particular year.

See also 

 Adulting
 Coming of age
 List of countries by minimum driving age

References